Wahlin or Wåhlin is a Swedish surname that may refer to
Anna Wåhlin (born 1970), Swedish polar researcher 
Jennie Wåhlin (born 1997), Swedish curler
Kristian Wåhlin (born 1971), Swedish musician and graphic designer
Lotta Wahlin (born 1983), Swedish golfer
Rudolf Wåhlin (1887–1972), Swedish long-distance runner
Sten Wåhlin (1914–1981), Swedish Army lieutenant general

Swedish-language surnames